Gordon Glen Kluzak (born March 4, 1964) is a Canadian former professional hockey player who played for the Boston Bruins of the National Hockey League (NHL) from 1982 to 1991. He was selected first overall by the Bruins in the 1982 NHL Entry Draft.

Playing career
Gord Kluzak was born in Climax, Saskatchewan. He grew up on a wheat farm in Saskatchewan, and attended high school in Wilcox, Saskatchewan at Athol Murray College of Notre Dame.

Kluzak played junior hockey for two seasons with the WHL's Billings Bighorns, where he was paired on defence with future NHLer Bob Rouse. He missed half of the 1981–82 season and entire 1982 playoffs after he tore ligaments in his left knee in a game against the Medicine Hat Tigers on Feb. 9, 1982, which would be the first of many knee problems for Kluzak.

The injury did not hurt his draft placement however, as he was rated as the No. 3 overall prospect and the No. 2 WHL prospect for the 1982 NHL draft by The Hockey News.

Harry Sinden, the Boston Bruins general manager, was sold on the young defenceman, and made him the 1st overall pick in that year's NHL Entry Draft. Sinden passed up on Kitchener Rangers star Brian Bellows, who was the popular choice amongst Bruin fans, and Gary Nylund of the Portland Winter Hawks, who many, including The Hockey News, felt was the better defenceman. Sinden made a deal with the Minnesota North Stars, who had the second pick that year, where he agreed to let them have Bellows with the second overall pick in exchange for Brad Palmer and Dave Donnelly.

Minnesota did end up picking Bellows, who went on to become a star in the NHL, with 485 goals and 1022 points over nearly 1200 NHL games. Nylund was drafted by the Toronto Maple Leafs and ended his career with 608 NHL games under his belt. Other notable NHL players drafted after Kluzak include Scott Stevens (5th, 1635 NHL games played), Phil Housley (6th, 1495 NHL games played), Dave Andreychuk (16th, 1639 NHL games played), Tomas Sandstrom (36th, 983 NHL games played), Pat Verbeek (43rd, 1434 NHL games played), and Doug Gilmour (134th, 1474 NHL games played). Kluzak, on the other hand was out of hockey at the age of 27 - felled by knee injuries, after playing in only 299 NHL games. He managed to avoid knee injuries for his first two NHL seasons. However, on Oct. 7, 1984, Kluzak tore ligaments in his left knee when he collided in mid-ice with New Jersey Devils defenceman Dave Lewis. This required major reconstructive surgery and forced Kluzak to miss the entire 1984–85 regular season and 1985 playoffs. He would re-injure the knee again in September 1986 and miss another season.

His best year in the NHL may have been 1987–88. Kluzak managed to play 66 of Boston's 80 games during the 1987–88 season, and all 23 playoff games, as Boston went to the Stanley Cup Finals. After that Kluzak's career stalled because of chronic knee problems that resulted in 11 surgeries. He would play in only 13 more games, his last being on November 5, 1990 against the New York Rangers. He announced his retirement on November 12, 1990.

International play

In 1982 Kluzak was chosen to represent Canada at the World Junior Championships. Prior to 1982 Canada had sent the defending Memorial Cup champions to represent the country at the world juniors. Due to the Memorial Cup champion's lack of success, 1982 became the first year that the top players in the country were sent.

Led by Kluzak and Kingston Canadians goaltender Mike Moffat, the Canadians outscored the opposition 45–14, including a 7–0 rout of the Soviet Union, en route to the country's first gold medal at the event.

In perhaps one of the most memorable moments in tournament history, Kluzak and his teammates stood at the blue line and sang the Canadian national anthem. Apparently, the organizers in Rochester, Minnesota had not expected Canada to win and did not have a recording of "O Canada".

Post-retirement
After being forced to retire prematurely, Kluzak enrolled at Harvard University, graduating in 1994 with a degree in Economics, and spent two years as the Chief of Staff for the state lottery. He then returned to Harvard, earning an MBA in 1998. Since then, he has worked for Goldman Sachs.

Kluzak also worked as a color commentator on Bruins telecasts from 1995–96 through 2003–04. He worked for NESN as a studio analyst from 2005-15.

Career statistics

Regular season and playoffs

International

Awards
World Junior Championships: 1982 (gold medal)
World Junior Championships Best Defenceman: 1982
World Junior Championships All-Star First Team: 1982
WHL All-Star Second Team: 1981–82
Canadian Amateur Junior Male Athlete of Year: 1982
Bill Masterton Memorial Trophy: 1989–90

References

External links

1964 births
Living people
Billings Bighorns players
Bill Masterton Memorial Trophy winners
Boston Bruins draft picks
Boston Bruins players
Boston Bruins announcers
Canadian ice hockey defencemen
Ice hockey people from Saskatchewan
National Hockey League broadcasters
National Hockey League first-overall draft picks
National Hockey League first-round draft picks
Harvard Business School alumni